Juan Eduardo Figueroa (born 14 July 1992) is an Argentine professional footballer who plays as a goalkeeper for Defensores Unidos.

Career
Figueroa started with San Lorenzo. He didn't appear competitively for the club, though was an unused substitute four times in all competitions in November/December 2011. Figueroa departed on 20 July 2013, subsequently signing for Primera B Nacional side Defensa y Justicia. He remained for the 2013–14 campaign as they won promotion, though the goalkeeper again didn't feature. Figueroa switched Defensa y Justicia for Defensores Unidos in January 2015. One hundred and twenty-five appearances occurred in Primera C Metropolitana across four campaigns, which culminated with them being promoted to the third tier.

Career statistics
.

Honours
Defensores Unidos
Primera C Metropolitana: 2017–18

References

External links

1992 births
Living people
People from Tres de Febrero Partido
Argentine footballers
Association football goalkeepers
Primera C Metropolitana players
Primera B Metropolitana players
San Lorenzo de Almagro footballers
Defensa y Justicia footballers
Defensores Unidos footballers
Sportspeople from Buenos Aires Province